Imlach is a surname. Notable people with the surname include:

 Brent Imlach (born 1946), Canadian ice hockey player
 Francis Brodie Imlach (1819–1891), Scottish dentist
 Gary Imlach (born 1960), British author, broadcaster and journalist (son of Stewart Imlach)
 Hamish Imlach (1940–1996), Scottish folk singer
 Mike Imlach (born 1962), English footballer (son of Stewart Imlach)
 Punch Imlach (1918–1987), Canadian ice hockey coach and general manager
 Stewart Imlach (1932–2001), Scottish footballer (father of Gary and Mike)